The 2000–01 Football League (known as the Nationwide Football League for sponsorship reasons) was the 102nd completed season of The Football League.

First Division

Team changes
The following teams changed division since the 1999–2000 season.

From First Division
Promoted to FA Premier League
 Charlton Athletic
 Manchester City
 Ipswich Town

Relegated to Second Division
 Walsall
 Port Vale
 Swindon Town

To First Division
Promoted from Second Division
 Preston North End
 Burnley
 Gillingham

Relegated from FA Premier League
 Wimbledon
 Sheffield Wednesday
 Watford

Play-offs 

Source:

Results

Top scorers

Maps

Second Division

Team changes
The following teams changed division since the 1999–2000 season.

From Second Division
Promoted to First Division
 Preston North End
 Burnley
 Gillingham

Relegated to Third Division
 Cardiff City
 Blackpool
 Scunthorpe United
 Chesterfield

To Second Division
Promoted from Third Division
 Swansea City
 Rotherham United
 Northampton Town
 Peterborough United

Relegated from First Division
 Walsall
 Port Vale
 Swindon Town

Play-offs 

Source:

Maps

Third Division

Team changes
The following teams changed division since the 1999–2000 season.

From Third Division
Promoted to Second Division
 Swansea City
 Rotherham United
 Northampton Town
 Peterborough United

Relegated to Football Conference
 Chester City

To Third Division
Promoted from Football Conference
 Kidderminster Harriers

Relegated from Second Division
 Cardiff City
 Blackpool
 Scunthorpe United
 Chesterfield

Play-offs 

Source:

Maps

See also
 2000–01 in English football
 2000 in association football
 2001 in association football

References

 
English Football League seasons
2